Megas Alexandros Trikala Football Club is a Greek football club, based in Trikala, Imathia, Greece

Honours

Domestic

 Imathia FCA Champions: 4
 1981–82, 1997–98, 2016–17, 2018–19
 Imathia FCA Cup Winners: 1
 2004–05

References

Football clubs in Central Macedonia
Imathia
Association football clubs established in 1965
1965 establishments in Greece
Gamma Ethniki clubs